Warren Hedley Williams (born 27 December 1963) is an Aboriginal Australian singer, musician and songwriter from Hermannsburg in Central Australia. As of 2013 he worked as a broadcaster on CAAMA Radio in Alice Springs.

Early life
Williams was born on 27 December 1963 in Hermannsburg, the son of country musician Gus Williams. He is an Arrernte man.

He started playing guitar at the age of six with his father, and later went to school at a Lutheran college in Adelaide: Immanuel College in Novar Gardens.

Music career 
In 2007, he wrote the musical Magic Coolamon, which debuted as the first ever Central Australian Indigenous musical.

Williams toured with John Williamson many times, including "Hillbilly Road" in 2008.

In 2015, Williams invited long-time friend and award-winning Australian singer Shane Nicholson to visit his hometown of Hermannsburg (Ntaria) to help break his writer's block. Williams took him to sacred sites and shared Aboriginal Dreaming stories which inspired Nicholson's ARIA-nominated album Hell Breaks Loose, which features the track 'Hermannsburg'.

In 2016, Williams teamed up with emerging artist Dani Young, writing and recording an album of traditional country duets in Nashville. The album, Desert Water was produced by Billy Yates, and features Jim Lauderdale. The album was released on 22 July 2016. The album debuted at #2 on the ARIA Country albums charts, and the first single "Two Ships" spent 6 weeks at #1 on Tamworth Country Radio.

Radio and television career 
In 1996, Williams was the first remote Indigenous broadcaster (RIBS) on the 8KIN FM network, presenting music shows live from Hermannsburg. He is the longest-serving broadcaster on CAAMA Radio,  presenting the mid-morning show from 9am - 11am on weekdays, as well as the 80s Mix on Monday evenings, Rockn on Wednesday evenings, and CAAMA's highest rating program Strictly Country on Tuesday and Thursday evenings. His programs are also played through the National Indigenous Radio Service.

In 2015, Williams made his directorial debut, writing and directing two episodes of the Aboriginal television series Our Place for ICTV.

Politics 
Williams stood as lead Australian Greens candidate for the two Northern Territory seats in the Australian Senate in the 2010 federal election, and again in the 2013 federal election. At the 2012 Northern Territory election, he stood for the Australia's First Nations Political Party in the seat of Namatjira.

Discography

Recognition and awards
In 2004, Williams  was the subject of an episode of the television series Nganampa Anwernekenhe.

In 2009 he was inducted into the Australian Country Music Hall of Fame. (His father, Gus, had become an inductee in 2000.)

AIR Awards
The Australian Independent Record Awards (commonly known informally as AIR Awards) is an annual awards night to recognise, promote and celebrate the success of Australia's Independent Music sector.

|-
| AIR Awards of 2012
|Urna Marra 
| Best Independent Country Album
| 
|-

ARIA Music Awards
The ARIA Music Awards is an annual awards ceremony that recognises excellence, innovation, and achievement across all genres of Australian music. They commenced in 1987.

! 
|-
| 1998
| "Raining on the Rock" (with John Williamson)
| ARIA Award for Best Indigenous Release
| 
| 
|-
| 2012
| Winanjjara: The Song Peoples Sessions 
| ARIA Award for Best World Music Album
| 
| 
|-

Australia Council for the Arts
The Australia Council for the Arts is the arts funding and advisory body for the Government of Australia. Since 1993, it has awarded a Red Ochre Award. It is presented to an outstanding Indigenous Australian (Aboriginal Australian or Torres Strait Islander) artist for lifetime achievement.

|-
| 2012
| himself
| Red Ochre Award
| 
|-

Country Music Awards (CMAA)
The Country Music Awards of Australia (CMAA) (also known as the Golden Guitar Awards) is an annual awards night held in January during the Tamworth Country Music Festival, celebrating recording excellence in the Australian country music industry. They have been held annually since 1973.

 (wins only)
|-
| 2008 || himself || Hands of Fame || 
|-
| 2009 || ""Australia Is Another Word for Free"" with John Williamson and Amos Morris|| Bush Ballad of the Year || 
|-

Deadly Awards
The Deadly Awards, (commonly known simply as The Deadlys), was an annual celebration of Australian Aboriginal and Torres Strait Islander achievement in music, sport, entertainment and community. They ran from 1996 to 2013.

|-
| Deadly Awards 1998
| "Raining on the Rock"
| Single of the Year
| 
|-
| Deadly Awards 2001
| Where My Heart Is
| Album of the Year
| 
|-

National Indigenous Music Awards
The National Indigenous Music Awards recognise excellence, innovation and leadership among Aboriginal and Torres Strait Islander musicians from throughout Australia. They commenced in 2004.

|-
| 2004
| himself
| Male Artist of the Year
| 
|-
| 2005
| "Dreamtime Baby"
| Most Popular Song
| 
|-
| rowspan="2"| 2006
| "Learn My Song"
| Song of the Year
| 
|-
| Be Like Home
| Best Cover Art
| 
|-
| rowspan="2"| 2010
| himself
| Act of the Year
| 
|-
| Looking Out
| Album of the Year
| 
|-
| rowspan="2"| 2012
| "Winanjjara"
| Traditional Song of the Year
| 
|-
| Winanjjara: The Song Peoples Sessions
| Album of the Year
| 
|-

References

External links 
 Warren H Williams homepage
 Warren H Williams : Places In Between review
 Warren H Williams radio interview Part 2 on Ben Sorensen's REAL Country
 Warren H Williams interview on NITV news about Nashville album
 Warren H Williams and Dani Young facebook page

1963 births
Living people
Indigenous Australian musicians
Australian male singers
Australian songwriters
Australian guitarists
Recipients of the Centenary Medal
Australian Greens candidates
Australian male guitarists